The Shakey's V-League 13th Season Reinforced Open Conference was the 27th conference of the Shakey's V-League and the third conference for its 13th season. Conference started October 1, 2016 at the PhilSports Arena in Pasig.

Participating teams

Format
The conference format as it follows:

Preliminaries
Single round robin preliminary

Semifinals
Top four teams after preliminary round will enter the semifinals round.
They will compete against each other in a best-of-three series as follows: Rank 1 vs Rank 4 and Rank 2 vs Rank 3.

Finals
Best-of-three series for the Final and Bronze matches.

Preliminary round

Team standings

|}

Match results

|}

Semifinals
 Ranking is based from the preliminary round.
 All series are best-of-3

Rank 1 vs Rank 4

|}

Rank 2 vs Rank 3

|}

Finals

3rd Place

|}

Championship

|}

Awards

Most Valuable Player (Finals)
 Michele Gumabao (POC)
Most Valuable Player (Conference)
 Alyssa Valdez (BOC)
Best Setter
 Iris Janelle Tolenada (POC)
Best  Outside Spikers
 Alyssa Valdez (BOC)
 Ennajie Laure (UST)

Best Middle Blockers
 Marivic Meneses (UST)
 Lilet Mabbayad (BOC)
Best Opposite Spiker
 Michele Gumabao (POC)
Best Libero
 Dennise Lazaro (BLP)
Best Foreign Guest Player
 Breanna Lee Mackie (POC)

Ref.:

References

Shakey's V-League conferences
2016 in Philippine sport